Zhinyu is a lunar impact crater that is located within Von Kármán crater on the far side of the Moon.  The crater is located west of the landing site of the Chinese Chang'e 4 lander.

The crater's name was approved by the IAU on 4 February 2019. It is a transliteration of the Chinese term “weaver girl” (織女), taken from the traditional myth The Cowherd and the Weaver Girl as well as an ancient Chinese constellation.

References